Jaume Mateu Lagrange (born 12 December 1985 in Mexico City, Mexico) is a Mexican actor. He began his career with a recurring character on the Televisa's telenovela Camaleones. His first notable role was as David Mondragón in the Mexican drama La fuerza del destino, and became part of the main cast of several telenovelas, including La mujer del Vendaval (2012), La sombra del pasado (2014), and Pasión y poder (2015).

Filmography

Theater

References

External links 
 

1985 births
Living people
People from Mexico City
21st-century Mexican male actors
Mexican male telenovela actors
Mexican male television actors
Mexican stage actors